Carmen Latretta Lundy (born November 1, 1954) is an American jazz singer. She has been performing for three decades, with a focus on original material. 

She has been positively compared with Aretha Franklin, Ella Fitzgerald and Sarah Vaughan. Lundy is also the sister of bassist Curtis Lundy.

Lundy's albums "Modern Ancestors" (2021) and "Fade to Black" (2022) were nominated for the Grammy Award for Best Jazz Vocal Album.

Biography

Lundy was born November 1, 1954, in Miami, Florida, and at the age of six began to study the piano. Her mother, Oveida, was the lead singer in a gospel group known as The Apostolic Singers. After Lundy joined her church junior choir, she decided to become a singer when she was 12 years old. While an opera major at the University of Miami, where she received a BA in Music, she sang with a jazz band and decided to sing vocal jazz.  She cites Dionne Warwick, Roberta Flack and Stevie Wonder as being among her first influences.

She moved to New York in 1978 where she was hired by the Thad Jones/Mel Lewis Jazz Orchestra and performed her first New York engagement at the Village Vanguard in Greenwich Village. The following year she had her first appearance on a self-titled album from a group called Jasmine featuring Bill O'Connell and Steve Berrios (West 54 Records).
In 1980 she formed her own trio, performing with pianists John Hicks and Onaje Gumbs. She has also performed with Walter Bishop Jr., Don Pullen, Mulgrew Miller, Billy Childs, Terri Lyne Carrington, Kip Hanrahan, Courtney Pine, Marian McPartland, and the band Quasimode.

Lundy has composed and published over forty songs. Her compositions have been recorded by such artists as Kenny Barron ("Quiet Times"), Ernie Watts ("At the End of My Rope"), and Straight Ahead ("Never Gonna Let You Go").

Lundy's first album, Good Morning Kiss (1985) featured several original compositions, and was reissued in 2002. Her second album was Night and Day (1986), and featured musicians Kenny Kirkland (piano), Alex Blake (bass), Curtis Lundy (bass), Victor Lewis (drums), Rodney Jones (guitar), Ricky Ford (tenor sax).

Lundy played the lead role in the European tour of Duke Ellington's Broadway musical, Sophisticated Ladies. Off-Broadway she portrayed Billie Holiday in Lawrence Holder's They Were All Gardenias. She made her television debut as the star of the CBS Pilot-Special Shangri-La Plaza (1990) in the role of Geneva.

The John F. Kennedy Center for the Performing Arts website has called Carmen Lundy "a woman of many faces: composer, arranger, producer, actress, painter, and sophisticated vocalist well known for her progressive bop and post-bop styling's—an uncompromising jazz singer whose every note is bulls-eye accurate" (Los Angeles Times). "Equally adept at love-struck ballads, songs of heartbreak, or full-out swing, Lundy wields a voice of agility and seductive allure [that] make for a potent combination."

In 2005 Lundy and producer Elisabeth Oei launched the label Afrasia Productions with Jazz & the New Songbook: Live at the Madrid recorded live at the Madrid Theatre in Los Angeles, also released on DVD. Lundy draws on repertoire from her previous recordings, backed by brother Curtis Lundy and Victor Lewis, pianists Billy Childs, Robert Glasper, Bobby Watson, Phil Upchurch, and Mayra Casales, a percussionist, who also released on Afroasia (the only one beside Lundy so far.) The labels second release was Come Home, her tenth album, featuring Geri Allen and Steve Turre, followed by Solamente, an album with recordings that originally served as reference demos, where she was playing all instruments herself. Lundy's latest release via Afrasia Productions was released on Feb 17, 2017, and features several guest artists, notably Patrice Rushen on piano.

Lundy's oil on canvas paintings have been exhibited in New York at The Jazz Gallery (Soho) and The Jazz Bakery, and in Los Angeles at the Madrid Theater. Her art also appears in the booklets that accompany her CDs.

Discography

With Geri Allen
 Timeless Portraits and Dreams (Telarc, 2006)

With Walter Bishop Jr.
 Cubicle (Muse, 1978)

References

External links
Official site
Carmen Lundy 2017 Interview at Soulinterviews.com

1954 births
Living people
University of Miami Frost School of Music alumni
American women jazz singers
American jazz singers
Arabesque Records artists
20th-century American painters
Musicians from Miami
Justin Time Records artists
20th-century American women
21st-century American women